Alone is a 2023 Indian Malayalam-language mystery thriller film directed by Shaji Kailas, written by Rajesh Jayaraman, and produced and distributed by Antony Perumbavoor through Aashirvad Cinemas. The story is set during the 2020 COVID-19 pandemic in India. It stars Mohanlal as the only character appearing in the film which otherwise features voice roles as supporting cast. 4Musics composed the film's background score and songs.

The film was developed during the COVID-19 pandemic in India as a small film that can be made within pandemic restrictions to help unemployed workers in Malayalam film industry. Principal photography lasted 18 days from September to October 2021. The film was originally meant to be a direct-to-OTT release.

Alone was released in theatres on 26 January 2023 where it received mixed reviews.

Premise
Kalidasan is a motivational speaker who starts living in a prominent flat in Kochi during the COVID-19 lockdown, with a need for something. As it is a COVID-affected area, no contact with anyone is possible, Kalidasan experience paranormal activities in the flat and begins to unravel the mystery.

Cast
Mohanlal as Kalidas, the only character seen on-screen, as he gets stranded in an apartment building during the COVID-19 pandemic in India.

Voice cast
 Prithviraj Sukumaran as Hari Bhai 
 Manju Warrier as Yamuna 
 Annie Shaji Kailas as Dr. Soosan 
 Siddique as Karthavu (Association President)
 Nandhu as the apartment's Chief Security
 Baiju Santhosh as ASI Rasheed
 Shankar Ramakrishnan as Vinod
 Renji Panicker as Colonel
 Mallika Sukumaran as Kalidas's Neighbour
 Suresh Krishna as Thomas Kuruvila, the caretaker of the apartment 
 Rachana Narayanankutty as Sreedevi
 Zeenath as Sheela Varky
 Jose as Binoy

Production

Development
Shaji Kailas said that Alone was developed after Mohanlal put forward a proposal to make a "small film" during the COVID-19 pandemic in India to help unemployed workers in film industry during the pandemic. For which, producer Antony Perumbavoor enquired for potential stories, to whom Kailas suggested a single character film about a man named Kalidas who gets trapped in Kerala during the pandemic while travelling from Coimbatore. Mohanlal and Kailas were collaborating for a film after 12 years. The screenplay was written by Rajesh Jayaraman. The title was announced on 4 October 2021. By then, filming had already begun. The title comes with the tagline "real heroes are always alone".

Filming
Principal photography of the film began on 27 September 2021. Filming was concluded on 22 October. The whole filming process was completed in 18 days. Kailas took the project after he had begun the production of Kaduva and was shot during its break. Abinandhan Ramanujam and Pramod K. Pillai was the cinematographers. Production design was done by Santhosh Raman. Kailas' son Jagan Kailas worked as an associate director in the film. Mohanlal began dubbing in May 2022. In November, Kailas said the film's post-production is on its finals stage.

Music
Initially, Jakes Bejoy was attached as the music composer. He was replaced by 4 Musics, who composed the film's background score and songs. The film originally had no plans to include any songs until filming was completed. After watching the visuals, 4 Musics suggested two songs that would fit the narrative. Kailas wanted more string instruments. 4 Musics chose Western style feeling it suits more with the film's theme, but they could not fully implement it since Kailas had his own views on the kind of music he wanted. For the second track, a rock song was added in the climax portion where the character arc of Kalidas is defined, which serves as the film's theme.

The first single "Life Is A Mystery" was sung by Irish musician Mick Garry who also wrote the lyrics, with additional lyrics added by Biby Mathew and Eldhose Alias, its mixing and mastering was done by Vivek Thomas. The song was recorded in Spain. The Times of India wrote that the song has "a funky style that takes us back to retro American music". It was released on 18 January 2023 by Aashirvad Cinemas label.

Release

Theatrical
In November 2021, it was reported that Alone would be released on a digital streaming platform. In June 2022, Kailas revealed that the film would be released in August 2022 on an OTT platform, which did not happen. Having had a change of plan, in October that year, a teaser was released announcing the film will have a theatrical release. The film received certification from the CBFC in December 2022. In a January 2023 interview, Kailas said Alone was meant to be a direct-to-OTT release. Alone was released in theatres on 26 January 2023.

Home Media
The satellite and digital rights of the film was acquired by Disney+ Hotstar and Asianet. The film was streamed on 3 March 2023 in Disney+ Hotstar.

Reception
Alone received mixed reviews.

Janani K. of India Today gave 3 out of 5 and wrote "Director Shaji Kailas’ Alone, starring Mohanlal, is a one-actor film that tries to be a thriller with a twist. But, it neither offers thrills nor the so-called twists have an impact on you."

References

External links 
 

2020s Malayalam-language films
One-character films
Films set in apartment buildings
Films about the COVID-19 pandemic
Films shot in Kochi
Films directed by Shaji Kailas
Aashirvad Cinemas films